The 2021–22 Tanzanian Premier League (known as the NBC Premier League for sponsorship reasons) is the 56th season of the Tanzanian Premier League, the top-tier football league in Tanzania (mainland only), since its establishment in 1965. The season started on 6 August 2020. The season ended with Simba S.C. clinching their 21st premier league title.

Stadiums

League table

Relegation play-offs

Semi-finals

First leg

Second leg

References

Tanzanian Premier League
Tanzanian Premier League
Tanzanian Premier League
Tanzania